Miko John Hughes (born February 22, 1986) is an American actor known for his film roles as a child, such as Gage Creed in Pet Sematary (1989), Kindergarten Cop (1990), Apollo 13 (1995), Spawn (1997), Mercury Rising (1998), Wes Craven's New Nightmare (1994), as well as his recurring role as Aaron on Full House from 1990 to 1995.

Early life
Hughes was born in Apple Valley, California, the son of Mary (née Phelps) and John Hughes, a special effects technician (not to be confused with late Breakfast Club director John Hughes). He has three older half-siblings: Mike, Mitch and Molly. He has English and Chickasaw Native American ancestry.

Career
Hughes started his acting career in a public service announcement when he was 22 months old, and followed that up by appearing in his first feature film five months later. From his years as a child actor, Hughes was consistently one of the busiest young actors in Hollywood. One of his first films was Jack the Bear, opposite Danny DeVito; in addition, he has starred on film in Pet Sematary (1989), Kindergarten Cop (1990), Wes Craven's New Nightmare (1994), Apollo 13 (1995), Spawn (1997), Zeus and Roxanne (1997), and Mercury Rising (1998) alongside Bruce Willis.

Hughes has also appeared in numerous television films. He has been a series regular, recurring character or guest star on many television series. He played Aaron Bailey on Full House from 1990 to 1995. Other appearances have been in Baywatch (1998), Sister Kate (1989–90), Beverly Hills, 90210 (1991), Melrose Place (1992), Touched by an Angel (1994), and The Nanny (1994). Hughes received an Emmy Award certificate for his participation as the voice of Tommy in the number-one-rated Fox animated television series Life with Louie (1995). His other voice-over credits include twin babies, Sly and Witt, in the feature film Baby Geniuses (1999).

After a break in his career, Hughes re-emerged as a teen in the science-fiction series Roswell. He played a villain who was part of a renegade group of aliens. As a musician, Hughes released two albums in 1995, at the age of nine. One is self-titled and the other is called Halloween Haunts. He wrote songs for both albums. They were recorded and released by his own company, Little Chief Inc. In 2013, Hughes directed the segment "See" in the horror anthology film Chilling Visions: 5 Senses of Fear.

Filmography

Film

Television

As director/screenwriter

Music Videos

References

External links
 
 

1986 births
Living people
American male child actors
American male film actors
American male television actors
20th-century American male actors
21st-century American male actors
Male actors from California
People from Apple Valley, California
American people of Chickasaw descent
American beekeepers
Native American male actors